Baa Bahoo Aur Baby (colloquially known as BBB or B3) is an Indian television dramedy series that aired in prime time on Star Plus between 2005 and 2010 with a total of two seasons. The series was produced by Hats Off Productions and centered around a fictitious Gujarati Thakkar family living in Parla East, Mumbai.

After the end of the first season, the second season was brought in August 2009 due to popular demand from viewers. However, as it was not well received like the first season, it went off the air on 22 February 2010.

Series

Plot

Season 1 
The season begins with a detailed introduction of all the members of the household and how they deal with all the issues impacting a joint family structure. They face different problems and misunderstandings. Notable episodic stories of this season are: Radhika's unrequited love for Anish; an NRI; Anish and Dimple's love story; Arvind not talking to his father, Labhshankar due to his drinking habit that has caused severe issues to the family from childhood to till date; Harshad being turned out of the house by Godavari and his return after 5 years; Praveena's tragic demise; Radhika and Birju's love story;Hemal and Gurinder's wedding;  the calamity of Praveen selling the house without everyone's consent to save Hemal's life by helping him to return the money taken as loan; and Jigar's coming of age. The inner turmoils of a matriarch leading a 20+ members family is beautifully represented.

Season 2 
The sons get Krishna villa renovated. The season focuses on the relationship of Radhika - Birju, and Jigar - Rimjhim. Reluctance from the family of Birju to accept Radhika as their daughter-in-law creates initial hiccups, but they get married eventually. Rimjhim is the daughter of a wealthy businessman and the Thakkar family helps her to elope from a forced arranged marriage as she and Jigar love each other. While Rimjhim and Jigar try to prove themselves worthy, Rekha enters the household as the unwed mother of a newborn whom she hands over to Gattu for care-giving. Gopal grows attached to the newborn girl.

In the last episode of the season; Godavari's biography, Sanyukt Parivaar Ki Safal Yatra: Baa, Bahoo Aur Baby, gets officially published.

Three Years Later 
Leela and Arvind are about to go to United States as Dimple is pregnant. Praveen's children are all grown up and pursuing their careers. Harshad and Shilpa open a maternity home in Godavari's name. Meenakshi is expecting her third child. Gudiya has had twin daughters. A breakthrough in polio treatment has helped Baby to recover from her polio. Birju and Radhika have a son named Aahan. Rimjhim has started a family catering business known as 'Thakkar Caterers'. Labhshankar has finally stopped drinking and is helping Rimjhim in business partnership by handling the accounts and deliveries of the catering service. And Gattu is taking care of babies in his playhouse which is built on the name of his foster daughter- 'Gatuki Palna Ghar' as he still misses Rekha and Gatuki. The season ends with the Thakkar family winning the 'Family of the Decade' award and all the family members are taking a family picture together.

The third season is yet to be released.....

Cast

Main 
Sarita Joshi as Godavari Thakkar aka Baa: She is the matriarch of the Thakkar family. She is a strict, stubborn, loving and caring woman. She has six sons and two daughters. If someone disobeys her, or interrupts in her conversation, she says- 'Koi behes nahi karega, jo behes karega vo sidha ghar se bahar jayega.' To that, her son Gopal always replies 'Aise..aise karke....' (while showing actions through his hand). She also has a catchphrase- "Kuch nahi sikhaya maa-baap ne, bas bhej diya!" She is secretly called Mogambaa, Jog Maya etc. by a few members of the family due to their frustration on her.
Arvind Vaidya as Labhshankar Thakkar aka Bapuji: He is Godavari's husband, a jolly and fun loving man who loves his family, a theatre actor and the patriarch of the family, only for saying as he was an alcoholic man. He frequently sings the famous song of the film Mughal-e-Azam 'More panghat pe....Nandlaal chedh gayo re....' He always teases Arvind to try and make Arvind talk to him, as Arvind never talks to him directly due to his habit of drinking. Gopal always calls his liquor 'Kaala khatta' as it smells very bad.
 Benaf Dadachandji as Radhika Thakkar Mehta aka Baby: Radhika is Godavari and Labhshankar's youngest child and younger daughter. She is handicapped (affected with polio). She is stubborn and lazy, yet everyone's favourite. She understands life and cares for all her family members.
 Deven Bhojani as  Gopal "Gattu" Thakkar: He is Godavari and Labhshankar's youngest (own) son. He is a foodie and an intellectually disabled child. He is also a great fan and admirer of actress Rani Mukherjee and always says that he wants to marry her after she finishes all her films' shootings.
 Rajeev Mehta as Arvind Thakkar: He is Godavari and Labhshankar's eldest son. He is an ill-tempered, strict and old-fashioned insurance agent. He mostly (even on special occasions like marriage) wears his checks-designed shirt. He always thinks about his brothers and sisters before himself. He obeys Baa at any point of time and say "Baa kabhi galat nahi hoti hai."
 Lubna Salim / Anjali Mukhi as Leela Raichura Thakkar: She is Arvind's wife. She came from a rich family and always insists on having imported things in the house.
 Paresh Ganatra as Praveen Thakkar: Praveen is Godavari and Labhshankar's second son. He is a stingy saree businessman.
 Vaishali Thakkar as Praveena Thakkar: She was Praveen's wife. She was a very strict mother and always got angry when her kids wreaked havoc in the house. She died in the crash of a building.
 Nimisha Vakharia as Charubala Thakkar Bhayani: She is Godavari and Labhshankar's third child and elder daughter. She is married to Tushar and lives in Valkeshwar. She keeps comparing the lifestyle of people in town and of those in suburbs.
 Nitin Vakharia as Tushar Bhayani: He is Charubala's husband. He always cracks stupid and irritating jokes which only Charubala finds funny. Praveen secretly calls Tushar a hyena as Tushar always laughs like one.
 Jamnadas Majethia as Harshad Thakkar: He is Godavari and Labhshankar's third son. When he was a child, one of his school friends once taunted him that as his mother was a cook, she would make Harshad a cook too. Baa felt insulted and vowed to make Harshad a doctor. Harshad, to fulfill his mother's dream, worked hard and became a successful doctor.
 Sonali Sachdeva as Shilpa Raichura Thakkar: She is Harshad's wife and a doctor. She is a loving, caring, calm, patient and responsible wife, daughter-in-law and mother.
 Rajesh Kumar as Subodh Thakkar: He is Godavari and Labhshankar's fourth son. He is an actor.
As the narrator in Season 2: Episode 48
 Suchita Trivedi as Meenakshi Thakkar: She is Subodh's shy and slow wife. She is a big devotee of Lord Krishna. Whenever Subodh tries to have romance with her, she runs away as she is old-fashioned.
 Kamlesh Oza as Hemal Thakkar: He is Godavari and Labhshankar's youngest (adopted) son. Hemal is actually the nephew of Godavari's sister-in-law, Gunvanti. But Hemal's parents died when he was very young. Thus, Godavari adopted him and raised him like his own son. He first worked in a call center, but later joined a bank.
 Sweta Keswani as Gurinder "Gudiya" Chaddah Thakkar: She is Hemal's Punjabi wife. She and Hemal fell in love with each other when they both met in bank. Later, Hemal secretly married her in the court to help Gurinder adopt her niece. When Godavari found about it, she decided to get Hemal and Gurinder married again as per the Hindu rituals in Mandap, along with Dimple's wedding. After marriage, Gurinder had a few problems adjusting in the house. But the Thakkars accepted her eventually.
 Amit Varma as Birju Mehta: He is Radhika's husband. He is an artist. His father had died in a car accident when Birju was just a child.

Recurring 
Manva Naik as Dimple Thakkar Kotak: She is Arvind and Leela's daughter.
 Gautam Rode as Anish Kotak: He is Dimple's husband. His father owns a beer company.
 Jay Soni / Shakti Arora as Jigar Thakkar: He is Arvind and Leela's son and Dimple's younger brother
 Menaka Lalwani as Rimjhim Talwar Thakkar: She is Jigar's wife.
 Devarsh Thakkar / Hardik Chandarana as Mehul Thakkar: He is Praveen and Praveena's son.
Devarsh Thaker retook his role as Mehul Thakkar from Season 1: Episode 504 till end of Season 2.
 Richa Bhadra as Mitali Thakkar: She is Praveen and Praveena's elder daughter. She is responsible.
 Swini Khara as Chaitali Thakkar: She is Praveen and Praveena's younger daughter. She is mischievous and wicked. She is Krishna Villa's James Bond. She finds out everyone's secrets and later uses that information as blackmailing tool.
 Khushi Dubey / Afia Tayebali as Simran Bhayani: She is Charubala and Tushar's elder daughter. She, like her mother, keeps showing off and comparing the life of people in town and of those in suburbs.
 Kartik Gantha as Saumil Thakkar: He is Harshad and Shilpa's son. He suffered from tumor. But with family's support and proper treatment, he recovered.
 Devanshi Jhaveri / Juhi Rangparia as Saloni Thakkar: She is Harshad and Shilpa's daughter and Saumil's elder sister.
 Smith Seth as Manav Thakkar: He is Subodh and Meenakshi's son, and Disha's elder brother. His cousins and Gattu sometimes casually call him 'Mansukhlal'.
 Navika Kotia as Lucky Thakkar: She is Gurinder's niece. After her mother (Gurinder's sister) died, Hemal and Gurinder adopted Lucky and raised her as their own daughter.
 Siddhartha Jadhav as Rajja: Rajja is the Thakkars' cook. He is fond of acting. He sometimes speaks Marathi. He and Arvind have a complicated relationship.
 Honey Chhaya as Narsi Kaka: Narsi Kaka is the Thakkars' elderly worker.

Episodic Appearances 
Lily Patel as Moti Baa: She is Labhshankar's mother and Godavari's mother-in-law. She is also Arvind, Subodh, Harshad, Gopal, Charubala, Praveen and Radhika's grandmother, and Hemal's foster grandmother. She has Amnesia and hence forgets things and goes sometimes too early or too future. Hence few members make fun of her illness by saying 'Phirse channel change hogaya'.
 Supriya Pathak as Gunvanti Mami: She is Godavari's sister-in-law. As she decided to settle in USA, she gave her bungalow, Krishna Villa, to Godavari. She offered to make the bungalow Godavari's legal property. But Godavari said that it was not needed as she trusted Gunvanti, and that she had faith in Gunvanti that she would not make them all homeless.
 Jiten Lalwani as Malay Tijoriwala: He is the Thakkars' childhood friend. His wife died due to tumor.
 Girish Pardeshi as Kamlesh Kakkad: He is Radhika's friend. He used to stammer on the letter k but with proper therapy, he can now speak k without stammering. Charubala had thought of getting Radhika and Kamlesh married, but Radhika refused for marriage saying that she wanted to see the world and be something.
 Madhavi Juvekar as Urmila Wagle: She is one of the Thakkars' neighbours. Due to a misunderstanding created by Arvind and Gopal, the Thakkars casually call her UW (which actually stands for Underwear).
 Atmaram Bhende as Damodar Kaka: He is one of the Thakkars' neighbours. As he faced a financial loss, the Thakkars helped him to pay for his granddaughter Vandana's wedding.
 Ayush Mahesh Khedekar as Gullel: He was kidnapped and taken away from his parents. Somehow, he escaped the kidnappers and started living on streets. Gopal found him and brought him home. The Thakkars published his photo in the newspaper, hoping that his parents would come for him. And they did come. They heartily thanked the Thakkars and took him home.
 Nimisha Vakharia as Prema: Prema is a maid who looks exactly like Charubala. Leela and Praveena hired her to tease and irritate Charubala.
 Kamalika Guha Thakurta as Revati: She is Anish's mother. She first hesitated to follow Godavari's traditions in Dimple and Anish's engagement. But eventually, she agreed.
 Jitendra Trehan as Ashutosh Kotak: He is Anish's father. He and Revati were divorced.
 Aditi Pratap as Aarya Kotak: She is Anish's sister.
 Ali Raza Namdar as Jasvant "Jassu" Bhai: He was about to be engaged to Leela, but Leela's father changed his mind and got Arvind and Leela married. Thus, when Jassu bhai came to the Thakkars' house, Arvind got jealous on seeing Leela giggling and blushing. Arvind grunted every time he saw Jassu bhai with Leela, and tried to keep them from talking to each other.
 Pushkar Shrotri as Inspector Paranjpe: He is a police inspector and the Thakkars' neighbour.
 Shubha Khote as Mangu Mausi: She is the Thakkars' new neighbour. She is a trickster and asks for things from people in a way that no one can deny. She fills people's mind with rubbish.
 Simple Kaul as Malaika: She was Birju's first crush .
 Aatish Kapadia as Prinjal: He was the Thakkars' former neighbour. His parents sent his marriage proposal for Radhika. But after meeting Prinjal, Radhika refused to marry him.
 Arya Rawal as Amita: She was engaged to Harshad. But she requested Baa to break the engagement due to an affair between her and someone else, and because she was pregnant. Baa broke the engagement. Baa did not disclose the reason for breaking the engagement, to preserve Amita's reputation. Amita's mother, unaware of this secret, criticised Baa for ten years until she found out the truth.
 Resham Tipnis as Devki: She is Praveena's sister and Mehul, Mitali and Chaitali's aunt.
 Bhamini Oza as Ms. Jagruti: She is the children's Gujarati and P.E. teacher.
 Deepshikha Nagpal as Ichaa: She is the Thakkars' childhood friend. All the males in the family, especially Praveen, try to impress her whenever she visits them. This annoyed the ladies of the house.
 Amit Singh Thakur as Mr Kakkad
 Chetan Hansraj as Kuku: He is Gurinder's friend whom she thought of as a brother. After seeing that all the males in the family were circling Ichha, and ignoring their wives, Gurinder invited Kuku to make the males jealous.
 Anupama Singh as Sumitra Mehta: She is Birju's mother and Radhika's mother-in-law.
 Dolly Minhas as Janki Mehta: Birju's aunt (Tai). Her husband died in a car accident along with his younger brother (Birju's father).
 Neena Kulkarni as Asha Ben: She was a writer who wrote Godavari's biography as a dedication to all those housewives whose work went unappreciated.
 Amardeep Jha as Meenakshi: the dhabha owner.
 Meenal Karpe as Malti Bhayani: Tushar's mother and Charubala's mother-in-law.
 Mehul Buch as Devendra Marfatia: Pooja's father.
 Mohan Bhandari as Priyavadhan Raichura: He is Leela's father, Arvind's father-in-law and Jigar and Dimple's maternal grandfather. He is a rich businessman who married Leela in the Thakkar family seeing Godavari's feminism and nature. He and Arvind have a complicated relationship.
 Darshan Jariwala as Dr. Akhilesh Jha: He is the doctor who conducted Saumil's operation during Saumil's tumor.
 Swati Shah as Mayuri Ben: She is one of the Thakkars' neighbours.
 Pooja Ruparel as Falguni Ruparel: She is a rich girl. Hemal fell in love with her. But after learning that Falguni wanted to marry her equal (someone rich), Hemal forgot about her.
 Delnaaz Irani as Zenobia: Praveen once fell in love with her.
 Karan Sharma as Anirudh Desai
 Harish Patel as Parshuram Talwar
 Rupali Ganguly as Rekha Sharma: Gatuki's mother.
 Firoz Irani as Baba Bakshi: He is a builder who tried to buy Krishna Villa forcibly from the Thakkars. He tried many tricks to convince them. He even tried to kill them all once. But eventually, the Thakkars saved Krishna Villa. And, after getting a glimpse of Godavari's feminism and courage, he excepted his defeat and became a good man.
 Sakshi Sem as Pooja Marfatia: Hemal's second love, who betrayed his trust.

Special appearances 
 Sharman Joshi (appears in Season 1, Episode 36), to promote Shaadi No. 1
 Soha Ali Khan (appears in Season 1, Episode 36), to promote Shaadi No. 1
 Ayesha Takia (appears in Season 1, Episode 37), to promote Shaadi No. 1
 Fardeen Khan (appears in Season 1, Episode 37), to promote Shaadi No. 1
 Esha Deol (appears in Season 1, Episode 38) to promote Shaadi No. 1
 Zayed Khan (appears in Season 1, Episode 38), to promote Shaadi No. 1
 Falguni Pathak (appears in Season 1, Episode 175), the Navratri special episode
 Jay Chhaniyara (appears in Season 1, Episode 187), to promote The Great Indian Laughter Challenge
 Bakhtiyaar Irani (appears in season 1, Episode  187), to promote Nach Baliye 2
 Tanaaz Currim (appears in Season 1, Episode 187), to promote Nach Baliye 2
 Rakhi Sawant (appears in Season 1, Episode 326), to promote Nach Baliye 3
 Abhishek Avasthi (appears in Season 1, Episode 326), to promote Nach Baliye 3
 Juhi Chawla (appears in Season 1, Episode 402), to promote Bhoothnath
 Katrina Kaif (appears in Season 1, Episode 448), to promote Singh Is Kinng

Production
The series was filmed at Swathi Studio in Goregaon, Mumbai.

In November 2008, the shootings and telecast of all the Hindi television series including this series and films were stalled on 8 November 2008 due to dispute by the technician workers of FWICE (Federation of Western India Cine Employees) for increasing the wages, better work conditions and more breaks between shootings. FWICE first took a strike on 1 October 2008 when they addressed their problems with the producers and production was stalled. A contract was signed after four days discussions, and shooting was happening only for two hours per day, after which differences increased between them while channels gave them time until 30 October 2008 to sort it out. Failing to do so led to protests again from 10 November 2008 to 19 November 2008, during which channels blacked out new broadcasts and repeat telecasts were shown from 10 November 2008. On 19 November 2008, the strike was called off after settling the disputes and the production resumed. The new episodes started to telecast from 1 December 2008.

In other media
Gattu's character, portrayed by Deven Bhojani, was used in the 2012 drama serial Alaxmi Ka Super Parivaar where he came as the nephew of Natwarlal and Mohandas.

Reception
The Indian Express stated, "The strength of the show is its characters that deliver a power-packed performance. The right concoction of situational humour and proper representation of characters remains the forte of the show. With an ensemble cast of seasoned stage artistes, the show manages to hold attention and evoke laughter. The show is an instant hit among the womenfolk. It's a sweet humorous tale worth a dekko."

References 

2005 Indian television series debuts
2010 Indian television series endings
StarPlus original programming
Indian television soap operas
Indian comedy television series
Comedy-drama television series
Indian drama television series
Television about mental health
Hats Off Productions